Lab/Shul is a Jewish nondenominational congregation in New York City. It was founded by Rabbi Amichai Lau-Lavie in 2012 when he was a rabbinical student as an experimental, pop-up synagogue with support from the UJA-Federation, Jewish foundations, and private donors.  The intent of the congregation is to experiment with various forms of Jewish practice, hence "Lab" in its name.  It now has approximately 300 families as members.

The organization does not have a permanent location, but rather uses a variety of locations around New York City. Lau-Lavie was originally inspired to found Lab/Shul after serving as a arts educator at B'nai Jeshurun in Manhattan, where he felt that religious services lacked the theatrical aspects necessary to enable participants, particularly children, to connect with the service; he founded a theater group, Storahtelling, that ultimately grew into Lab/Shul.  

The organization describes itself as "everybody friendly" and is prominent among LGBTQ Jews, and Lau-Lavie identifies as gay; it also controversially supported intermarriage as early as 2017 despite Lau-Lavie's ordination as a conservative rabbi, at which time Lau-Lavie left the Conservative Jewish movement.

Lab/Shul frequently holds its events in the round.

During the COVID-19 pandemic, Lab/Shul has experimented with a range of virtual services, including a "Shabbat ShaMorning" service over Zoom in partnership with the Union for Reform Judaism.

Lab/Shul is a member of the Jewish Emergent Network.

References

External links 

 

Synagogues in New York City
2012 establishments in New York City